The predaceous aeolis (Himatina trophina) is a species of sea slug, an aeolid nudibranch, a marine heterobranch mollusc in the family Flabellinidae.  This species was commonly known as Flabellina fusca, a junior synonym.

Distribution
This species is frequent in British Columbia and extends around the North Pacific to Alaska and the Sea of Okhotsk, Russia.

Diet
Himatina trophina mainly feeds on hydroids, it was also once believed to feed on tube worms but the species actually just preferred the hydroids which were growing on the outside of the tube worm. It has been reported feeding on other nudibranchs, crustacea and polychaete worms.

References

Flabellinidae
Gastropods described in 1890